The Chinijo Archipelago is a small archipelago located in the northeastern part of the Canary Islands, north of the island of Lanzarote. The archipelago includes the islets of Montaña Clara, Alegranza, La Graciosa, Roque del Este and Roque del Oeste. The archipelago is administered by Lanzarote and belongs to the municipality of Teguise. La Graciosa is the only inhabited island, with a population of around 700.

The name of the archipelago is a reference to its reduced dimensions as the word chinijo is a local colloquial adjective used to describe something small.

The archipelago is part of the natural park Parque natural del Archipiélago Chinijo, designated in 1986. The natural park, total area , also includes part of the rocky north coast of the island Lanzarote (los riscos de Famara). The area of the natural park overlaps with that of a separately designated marine reserve. The European Union designated a Special Protection Area for birds in 1994.

References

External links

Islands of the Canary Islands
Natural parks of Spain
Marine reserves of Spain
Protected areas of the Canary Islands
Archipelagoes of Spain
Landforms of the Canary Islands